Henri Aalto (born 20 April 1989) is a Finnish professional football defender who plays for Finnish Veikkausliiga club Honka. He began his senior club career playing for Honka and made his league debut at age 19 in 2008. He helped Honka win two successive League Cup titles and the Finnish Cup.

Club career

Honka
Aalto was born in Espoo, Finland. Raised in Honka's youth ranks, he made his first team debut on 27 April 2008, at the age of 19, in a match against MYPA. He represented Honka for eight seasons in 140 league matches in which he scored 8 goals.

SJK
On 15 March 2015, it was announced that Aalto had signed a contract with SJK. Aalto made his league debut for the club on 19 April 2015, playing all ninety minutes of a 1–0 home victory over RoPS. He spent the 2015 and 2016 Veikkausliiga seasons with the club.

VfB Oldenburg
In the winter of 2017 Aalto signed a contract with VfB Oldenburg, in the German Regionalliga. Aalto made his competitive debut for the club on 5 February 2017 in a 3–3 draw in the league with Lupo Martini. He scored his first league goal for the club exactly two weeks after he made his debut, with it coming in the 34th minute of a 2–1 league defeat to Weiche Flensburg. He would go on to make 32 league appearances for the club, scoring 1 goal.

Return to Honka
In July 2018 it was announced that Aalto would return to Honka.

International career
Aalto has capped 14 matches for various Finland youth teams. He made his debut for the Finland U21 in a match against Estonia U21 on Esport Arena on 11 February 2009 when he replaced Jussi Heikkinen for the second period of the match.

Career statistics

Club

Honours and achievements

Club

Honka
Finnish League Cup: 2010, 2011
Finnish Cup: 2012

SJK
Veikkausliiga: 2015
Finnish Cup: 2016

Individual
Veikkausliiga Team of the Year: 2018

References

External links

 VfB Oldenburg official profile 
 
 

Living people
1989 births
Footballers from Espoo
Association football defenders
Finnish footballers
FC Honka players
Grankulla IFK players
Pallohonka players
Seinäjoen Jalkapallokerho players
VfB Oldenburg players
Veikkausliiga players